Baridini is a tribe of flower weevils in the family Curculionidae. There are about 16 genera and at least 40 described species in Baridini.

Genera
 Aulacobaris Desbrochers, 1892
 Aulobaris LeConte, 1876
 Baris Germar, 1817
 Cosmobaris Casey, 1920
 Desmoglyptus Casey, 1892
 Eurhinus
 Hesperobaris Casey, 1892
 Microbaris Casey, 1892
 Orthoris LeConte, 1876
 Plesiobaris Casey, 1892
 Pseudobaris LeConte, 1876
 Pycnobaris Casey, 1892
 Rhoptobaris LeConte, 1876
 Stenobaris Linell, 1897
 Trepobaris Casey, 1892
 Trichobaris LeConte, 1876

References

Further reading

 
 
 
 

Baridinae